The Japanese Lover is the eighteenth book by Chilean author Isabel Allende. It was published in 2015 and tells the story of a wartime love story between a Polish woman and a Japanese American in the aftermath of the Nazi Invasion of Poland in 1939. The book is set in World War II. Just like Allende's other books, it tells the story which spans decades.

It follows the magical realism and historical romance/fiction like her previous books. The Japanese Lover also coincided with Allende receiving the Presidential Medal of Freedom by US President, Barack Obama.

Plot Synopsis
The story is set in 2015 and first introduces us to octogenarian Alma Belasco who is moving in the Lark House, a retirement home for quirky individuals in San Francisco. Here we are also introduced to Lark House's caretaker Irina Bazili, a young Moldovan immigrant who seems to have some intense trauma of her own. Because of her nature, Irina is hired by Alma as her personal secretary. As the story progresses we are introduced to a secret admirer of Alma, through a series of letters, notes and gifts. Accompanying Alma on recovering these clues are Irina and Alma's grandson Seth who's in love with Irina. As Irina becomes closer to Seth and Alma, she discovers the photo of a man in Alma's room, who Alma introduces as Ichimei Fukuda, a Japanese-American whom Alma met in 1939. Alma tells Irina the story of how when Germany was invading Poland in 1939, she was sent as a girl of 8 to San Francisco to her wealthy uncle and aunt to escape the holocaust. Throughout the book we are taken through various momentous events of the 2nd half of the 20th century and also Alma's own experiences. We learn how Alma befriended Ichimei and how they were separated due to the Pearl Harbor attacks, as all Japanese-Americans being sent to Internment zones. We also see how they maintained their secret romance for decades through the means of letter. At one point Alma, married Nathaniel, a childhood friend of both hers and Ichimei while still continuing her romance with Fukuda. Irina despite trying to avoid any romance, becomes closer to Seth and tells her about her abusive relationship with her step-father. As the young pair grows closer, Alma grows frailer and frailer, finally passing away one day. The story closes with one more letter between the two fated lovers who were never meant to be.

Reception
Just like her other books, The Japanese Lover can also be called a commercial success being a bestseller. The book covers a lot of material from the 1930s until the 2010s but in the process loses itself to lengthy writing failing to leave a mark, and the big cast of characters, losing themselves to stereotypes. As written by Lucy Ferris of the New York Times, the thin plot and weakly motivated characters, fail to lift this novel very high. The Los Angeles Times stated, "The Japanese Lover is a humorless and earthbound disappointment".

References

Novels by Isabel Allende
2015 novels
Novels set during World War II
Novels set in Poland
Novels set in San Francisco
Atria Publishing Group books